Road Runner Express may refer to:
 Road Runner Express (Six Flags Fiesta Texas)
 Road Runner Express (Six Flags Magic Mountain)

It may also refer to these roller coasters formerly known as Road Runner Express:
 Beaver Land Mine Ride at Geauga Lake
 Frankie's Mine Train at Six Flags Great Escape and at Frontier City
 Gotham City Gauntlet: Escape from Arkham Asylum at Six Flags New England
 Rattle Snake at Walibi Holland